Iceland competed at the 1984 Summer Paralympics in Stoke Mandeville, Great Britain and New York City, United States. 13 competitors from Iceland won 10 medals, 2 silver and 8 bronze, and finished 36th in the medal table.

Medalists

See also 
 Iceland at the Paralympics
 Iceland at the 1984 Summer Olympics

References 

1984
1984 in Icelandic sport
Nations at the 1984 Summer Paralympics